Timbellus radwini, common name Radwin's murex, is a species of sea snail, a marine gastropod mollusk in the family Muricidae, the murex snails or rock snails.

Description
The size of an adult shell varies between 30 mm and 40 mm.

Distribution
This marine species can be found in the Caribbean Sea along Belize and Honduras.
.

References

 Merle D., Garrigues B. & Pointier J.-P. (2011) Fossil and Recent Muricidae of the world. Part Muricinae. Hackenheim: Conchbooks. 648 pp. page(s): 133

Muricidae
Gastropods described in 1979